A secured creditor is a creditor with the benefit of a security interest over some or all of the assets of the debtor.

In the event of the bankruptcy of the debtor, the secured creditor can enforce security against the assets of the debtor and avoid competing for a distribution on liquidation with the unsecured creditors.

In most legal systems, secured creditors also have the option of releasing their security and proving in the liquidation, although, in practice, they would rarely do so.

See also
 Preferential creditor

References

Credit
Bankruptcy
Insolvency